Love Again may refer to:

Music

Albums
 Love Again (Ayumi Hamasaki album), 2013
 Love Again (John Denver album) or the title song, 1996

Songs
 "Love Again" (Brandy and Daniel Caesar song), 2019
 "Love Again" (Cedric Gervais song), 2014
 "Love Again" (Dua Lipa song), 2021
 "Love Again" (Hedley song), 2017
 "Love Again" (The Kid Laroi song), 2023
 "Love Again" (Kreesha Turner song), 2012
 "Love Again" (NM song), from the video game Dance Dance Revolution, 2009
 "Love Again", by Carly Rae Jepsen from Emotion, 2015
 "Love Again", by Cascada from Everytime We Touch, 2007
 "Love Again", by Eddie Cochran from Never to Be Forgotten, 1962
 "Love Again", by Girl's Day from Girl's Day Everyday 5, 2017
 "Love Again", by Kelly Rowland from the soundtrack for the film Meet the Browns, 2008
 "Love Again", by Pentatonix from PTX, Vols. 1 & 2, 2014
 "Love Again", by Rae Morris from Unguarded, 2015
 "Love Again", by Todd O'Neill, 2017
 "Love Again", by Tweet, 2009
 "Love Again (Akinyele Back)", by Run the Jewels from Run the Jewels 2, 2014

Other uses
 Love Again (film), a 2023 American romantic comedy-drama film
 Love Again (TV series), a 2012 South Korean series
 "Love Again", a 1974 poem by Philip Larkin and a 2003 BBC play based on his later life

See also
 To Love Again (disambiguation)